Wong Tai Sin Temple may refer to:

 Wong Tai Sin Temple (Hong Kong), a shrine and tourist attraction in Hong Kong
 Wong Tai Sin Temple (Guangzhou), a temple in Guangzhou, Guangdong province, China
 Wong Dai Sin Temple (Markham), a Taoist temple in Ontario, Canada